James Galbraith Moir (11 November 1879– unknown) was a Scottish footballer who played in the English Football League for Blackburn Rovers and in the Scottish Football League for Celtic (where his sole honour was the Glasgow Merchants Charity Cup in 1903).

He should not be confused with James Moir, another Scot who played in the same position of right half in the same period for clubs including Woolwich Arsenal.

References

1879 births
Scottish footballers
Footballers from West Dunbartonshire
English Football League players
Scottish Football League players
Association football wing halves
Vale of Leven F.C. players
Celtic F.C. players
Blackburn Rovers F.C. players
Clyde F.C. players
Year of death missing
People from Bonhill